Charley "Lefty" Hill was an American baseball outfielder in the Negro leagues.  He played with several clubs from 1912 to 1924.

References

External links
 and Baseball-Reference Black Baseball stats and Seamheads

Chicago American Giants players
Chicago Giants players
Dayton Marcos players
Kansas City Monarchs players
St. Louis Giants (1924) players
Year of birth missing
Year of death missing
Baseball outfielders